Alchemical Symbols is a Unicode block containing symbols for chemicals and substances used in ancient and medieval alchemy texts. Many of the symbols are duplicates or redundant with previous characters.

Few fonts support more than a few characters in this block as of 2021. One that does and is free for personal use is Symbola 14.0.

Block

History
The following Unicode-related documents record the purpose and process of defining specific characters in the Alchemical Symbols block:

External links 
Wiktionary:Appendix:Unicode/Alchemical Symbols

References 

Unicode blocks